Brachynemurini is a tribe of antlions in the family Myrmeleontidae. There are about 16 genera and at least 90 described species in Brachynemurini.

Genera
 Abatoleon Banks, 1924
 Ameromyia Banks, 1913
 Argentoleon Stange, 1994
 Atricholeon Stange, 1994
 Austroleon Banks, 1909
 Brachynemurus Hagen, 1888
 Chaetoleon Banks, 1920
 Clathroneuria Banks, 1913
 Dejuna Navás, 1924
 Enrera Navás, 1915
 Ensorra Navás, 1915
 Mexoleon Stange, 1994
 Peruveleon Miller & Stange, 2011
 Scotoleon Banks, 1913
 Stangeleon Miller, 2008
 Venezueleon Stange, 1994

References

Further reading

 

Myrmeleontidae
Insect tribes